Schanulleke is a Flemish comic book character, also known as Schabolleke with an 'o', who originated in the Belgian comics series Suske en Wiske. In the series she is Wiske's beloved rag doll. Between 1986 and 1993 Schanulleke received her own spin-off series. The character's name in English is Molly, Sawdust or Muffin.

History

Schanulleke was introduced in the very first panel of Suske en Wiske, along with her owner Wiske, namely in the album Rikki en Wiske in Chocowakije (1945). Her original name was "Schalulleke", later changed into "Schabolleke" for publication in the Netherlands, both Flemish dialect expressions for a scallion. When it was later decided to use one translation for both the Netherlands and Flanders her name was changed again from "Schalulleke" to "Schanulleke", because the word "lul" is Dutch slang for "penis". The name change became official in the Suske en Wiske story "De Schone Slaper" ("Sleeping Beau") (1965).

Character

Schanulleke is a little rag doll, always portrayed wearing a red dress, indicating it is female. Wiske loves her with a passion and treats her like a mother. She is always heartbroken whenever Schanulleke is kidnapped, lost or threatened. Whenever people mock her for loving a doll at her age she feels insulted.

In some stories the kidnapping of Schanulleke brings the plot into motion, like "Prinses Zagemeel" ("Princess Sawdust") (1949), "De Knokkersburcht" ("The Batterers' Fortress")  (1953) and "De Laatste Vloek" ("The Last Curse") (2002). She is also brought to life in "Bibbergoud" (1950), "De Sterrenplukkers" (1952), "Het Vliegende Bed" (1959), "De Dulle Griet" (1966), "De Poppenpakker" (1973), "De Vlijtige Vlinder" (1976),  "Sony-San" (1986), "De Mysterieuze Mijn" (1990), "Amber" (1999), "De Kus van Odfella" (2003) and "De Gevangene van Prisonov" (2003).

Despite being an inanimate object and usually not being the focus of the stories, Schanulleke is still one of the few characters in the franchise who has been present in most of the stories.

Spin-off

From 1986 until 1993 Schanulleke received her own comic strip. The first two stories, "Eiko, de wijze boom" and "Schanulleke in de dierentuin" were drawn by Willy Vandersteen himself and were long stories. He also gave her a sidekick: the clown doll Duddul. Later his studio employees, Eric De Rop  and Patty Klein, continued the series, but as a gag-a-day comic. The series have been published in Okki and Suske en Wiske Weekblad.

List of Schanulleke albums

 "Eiko, de wijze boom"
 "Schanulleke in de dierentuin"
 "Kattekwaad"
 "Poppenmoppen"
 "Popverdorie"
 "Poppenkast"

In popular culture

Child daycare centers in Meerbeke and Roeselare, Flanders have been named after the character, as well as a children's clothing store in Woerden and IJsselstein.

The character was made into an actual rag doll too.

Sources

Spike and Suzy
Comics characters introduced in 1945
Fictional dolls and dummies
Female characters in comics
Belgian comic strips
Belgian comics titles
Comics spin-offs
1986 comics debuts
1993 comics endings
Gag-a-day comics
Comics about cats
Fantasy comics
Humor comics
Belgian comics characters
Comics by Willy Vandersteen
Rag dolls